Basaidu (also Romanized as Bāsa‘īdū, Bāsa‘īdow, and Bāsīdu) is a village in Dulab Rural District, Shahab District, Qeshm County, Hormozgan Province, Iran. At the 2006 census, its population was 1,662, in 359 families.

Etymology 
Despite phonetic similarity, Basaidu is not a take on the dynastic name of the Bu Saidi sultans of Oman who in fact ruled Qeshm Island and vicinity until the mid 19th century. Instead, the name is the ancient Greek/Hellenistic Poseidonia, named after the sea god, Poseidon.  Further up the Gulf, ports of Apollonia (Obolla) and Apollodorus (Abadan), among others, likewise carry ancient Hellenistic names.

References 

Populated places in Qeshm County